The Mount Calm Independent School District is a public school district based in Mount Calm, Texas, United States. Located in Hill County, a portion of the district extends into Limestone County.

Schools
Mount Calm ISD has one campus with two buildings. Mount Calm Elementary serves students in grades pre-kindergarten through eight. Mount Calm High School serves students in grades nine through twelve. In an election held on November 3, 2009, voters in the district approved a $1.5 million bond issue that calls for the construction of a new high school building. Of the 195 votes cast, 110 (56.4%) were in favor of the measure with 85 (43.6%) opposed. Before the new high school was built, students attended high school in one of three neighboring districts - Hubbard, Penelope, or Axtell.

Academic achievement
In 2009, the school district was rated "academically acceptable" by the Texas Education Agency.

Special programs

Athletics
Mount Calm High School plays six-man football.  The team is known as the Panthers.

See also

List of school districts in Texas

References

External links
Mount Calm ISD

School districts in Hill County, Texas
School districts in Limestone County, Texas